This page is a list of all the matches that Algeria national football team has played between 2000 and 2009.

2000

2001

2002

2003

2004

2005

2006

2007

2008

2009

Notes

References 

Algeria national football team results (2000–2009)

External links
Algeria: Fixtures and Results – FIFA.com

2000s in Algeria
2000-09
1999–2000 in Algerian football
2000–01 in Algerian football
2001–02 in Algerian football
2002–03 in Algerian football
2003–04 in Algerian football
2004–05 in Algerian football
2005–06 in Algerian football
2006–07 in Algerian football
2007–08 in Algerian football
2008–09 in Algerian football
2009–10 in Algerian football